Tony Ford or Anthony Ford may refer to:

Tony Ford (footballer, born 1944), former English football player and manager, played for both Bristol clubs, managed Hereford and Hearts
Tony Ford (footballer, born 1959), former English footballer, made 931 league appearances for clubs including Grimsby, Stoke, West Bromwich and Mansfield
Tony Ford (judge) (1942–2020), New Zealand judge
Tony Ford (weightlifter) (born 1939), former English Olympic weightlifter
Tony Ford (rugby league) (born 1946), Australian rugby player
Anthony Ford (weightlifter) (born 1939), British Olympic weightlifter

See also
Anthony Forde (disambiguation)